Helsingborg Arena is a multi-purpose arena, located in Helsingborg, Sweden. Helsingborg Arena is run by the municipal company Helsingborg Events and Idrottspark AB.  Helsingborg Arena has been part of the municipal company Helsingborg Arena and Scen AB.

History
Plans for the new arena began in 2005. It was designed by the engineering consultancy company Sweco AB. The inauguration of the arena took place on 30 November 2012. The arena was funded by the Henry and Gerda Dunker Foundation, established by the late businessman and philanthropist Henry Dunker (1870–1962).

Helsingborg Arena has a floor area of 21,000 square meters and a ceiling height of at most 15 meters. The arena holds a maximum of 5,500 spectators at concerts and 4,700 spectators at sporting events.

See also
List of indoor arenas in Sweden

References

External links

 

Buildings and structures in Helsingborg
Handball venues in Sweden
Sport in Helsingborg
Sports venues completed in 2012
Tourist attractions in Skåne County
21st-century establishments in Skåne County